This is a list of villages in Kyangin Township, Hinthada District, Ayeyarwady Region, Burma (Myanmar).

References
This list was derived from the Excel spreadsheets available at http://themimu.info/Pcodes/index.php.

Kyangin